Fondi Italiani per le Infrastrutture (Italian Funds for the Infrastructures) may refer to:
Fondi Italiani per le Infrastrutture SGR, the company that manages the fund
 Primo Fondo Italiano per le Infrastrutture, the first investment fund
 Secondo Fondo Italiano per le Infrastrutture, the second investment fund